Curibaya District is one of six districts of the province Candarave in Peru.

References